William Ellis (1834 – February 1, 1875) served in the Union Army during the American Civil War. He received the Medal of Honor.

Ellis was born in England in 1834 but his official residence when he received his Medal of Honor was listed as Watertown, Wisconsin. His name was misspelled as "William Elise" on his Medal of Honor citation.

He died February 1, 1875, in San Bernardino County, California.

Medal of Honor citation
His award citation reads:
The President of the United States of America, in the name of Congress, takes pleasure in presenting the Medal of Honor to First Sergeant William Ellis, United States Army, for extraordinary heroism on 14 January 1865, while serving with Company K, 3d Wisconsin Cavalry, in action at Dardanelles, Arkansas. First Sergeant Ellis remained at his post after receiving three wounds, and only retired, by his commanding officer's orders, after being wounded the fourth time.

See also
List of American Civil War Medal of Honor recipients

Notes

References

1834 births
1875 deaths
People of Wisconsin in the American Civil War
Military personnel from Wisconsin
People from Watertown, Wisconsin
United States Army Medal of Honor recipients
Union Army soldiers
English-born Medal of Honor recipients
English emigrants to the United States
American Civil War recipients of the Medal of Honor